The 2018 Liga 3 East Kalimantan is the third edition of Liga 3 (formerly known as Liga Nusantara) East Kalimantan as a qualifying round for the national round of 2018 Liga 3. PSAD Mulawarman, winner of the 2017 Liga 3 East Kalimantan are the defending champions. The competition started on 22 April 2018.

Format
In this competition, 19 teams are divided into 3 groups. The two or three best teams are through to knockout stage. The winner will represent East Kalimantan in the national round of 2018 Liga 3.

Teams
There are 19 clubs which will participate in this season.

Group stage
This stage started on 22 April 2018.

Group A
 All matches held in Segiri Stadium (for opening ceremony and first match only), Palaran Stadium, and Sempaja Stadium, Samarinda

Group B
 All matches held in Panglima Sentik Stadium, Penajam

Group C
 All matches held in Taman Prestasi Stadium, and Bessai Berinta Lang-lang Stadium, Bontang

References

2018 in Indonesian football
Sport in East Kalimantan